This a list of characters in the Left Behind novel series by Tim LaHaye and Jerry B. Jenkins.

Suhail Akbar

Suhail Akbar is a supporting antagonist in the Left Behind series. A native of Pakistan, he was a prominent member of the Global Community. He was hired by Nicolae Carpathia during the last half of the Tribulation period to be his Security and Intelligence chief in control of Peacekeepers and Morale Monitors throughout all the world regions. Jim Hickman was his predecessor. In contrast to the ineptitude of Hickman, upon hearing the appointment of Akbar, David Hassid feared he would be competent enough to stymie the Tribulation Force. Akbar was characterized as a man who is reticent and slow to voice an opinion, but someone who is loyal and effective behind the scenes.

In Desecration, he received the mark of the beast along with his fellow members of the Global Community cabinet – Walter Moon and Viv Ivins – at the Temple Mount a day before Carpathia committed the abomination of desolation. For his mark, he got a giant black 42 that dominated his forehead. Later he was ordered to bomb the gathering of Christians and Jews at Petra, planning for a BLU-82 and a "lance" missile to be dropped on them, but the inhabitants there were unharmed. He had the esteem of the Supreme Potentate that he was entrusted with organizing "the most massive offensive in the history of mankind" to drive the Christians and Jews from Jerusalem and Petra. Carpathia said to Director Akbar that the practically limitless monetary and military resources afforded to him for this endeavor would make every other historical military strategist hang his head in shame. In Glorious Appearing, even though he was entrusted to command the overwhelming forces to overrun Petra and Jerusalem of the Global Community One World Unity Army, Suhail was publicly shamed for daring to mention the destruction of New Babylon in front of Carpathia in his underground bunker in Solomon's Stables and was later beaten to death on Carpathia's orders by another Unity Army Officer with a rattan rod.

Security Director Akbar was loyal to Nicolae Carpathia, always zealous to carry about his directives, even though these directives came in a pique or at a whim. In Desecration, he saw Carpathia personally murder high-ranking loyal personnel – such as Loren Hut and Walter Moon – for failing to fulfill Carpathia's orders, even though they acted competently and gave an earnest effort. For those murders, Akbar lent Carpathia his side arm when Carpathia vehemently requested it. On his own initiative, he also ordered the execution of two fighter pilots who failed to incinerate the stronghold of Petra due to divine protection of the inhabitants, even though the pilots hit their targets and the bombs detonated. Director Akbar ironically died under similar circumstances for a minor infraction just hours before the Glorious Appearing of Jesus Christ.

Chief Akbar was willing to stand up for competent personnel under him. When one of the pilots attacking Petra appeared to sound insubordinate while communicating to mission command at the Global Community palace after he had dropped his ordinance on Petra when he suggested to abort a subsequent missile launch towards because it seemed to be supererogatory, Akbar defended him of the insubordination when Carpathia was offended by the pilots's tone and Leon Fortunato demanded for the pilot to be reprimanded. However, Akbar had no qualms in killing his pilots once Carpathia expressed his disappointment in their performance and when they pridefully refused to conform to party line of the Global Community that they missed their target due to pilot error because they insisted that execution of the attack was impeccable but the Christians survived due to some kind of miracle.

Akbar is not only loyal to Carpathia, but actually regards him as a divine figure; his attitude is similar to a divine command theorist or a theological voluntarist who regards whatever God wills constitutes the basis for morality or truth. He may have complied with Carpathia's directives out of personal and professional expediency instead of sincere reverence because loyalty to Carpathia is what had advanced his career to the point where he became the Director of Security and Intelligence to the Global Community. When questioned by Carpathia about whether the execution of two innocent people bothered his conscience, Akbar said that Carpathia was the "father of truth", reiterating Carpathia's remarks after he finished the lie detector test, where Carpathia reported some obvious falsehoods that were assessed to be truthful replies. When one of stewards on Carpathia's plane referred to Leon Fortunato as "Mr. Fortunato", Suhail corrected him saying that it is "Reverend Fortunato", but said that he did not mind but he should not make that mistake in front of "His Excellency". When the steward replied, "or the Most High Reverend Father", Akbar chuckled. Suhail probably does not hold Fortunato or the role of Most High Reverend Father of Carpathianism in high esteem.

In the dramatic audio for the kids series, during Carpathia's entrance in Jerusalem, Lionel Washington says that while has in the Morale Monitor program, they had a picture of Suhail Akbar staring up at you during every meal.

Criticism

Suhail Akbar's portrayal in the novels was criticized for being anti Muslim.

Abdullah Smith Ababneh ("Smitty")
Abdullah Ababneh is a former Jordanian fighter pilot, first officer for the Phoenix 216, Royal Jordanian Air Force, Amman; lost divorced wife and two children in Rapture; former first officer, Phoenix 216; a principal Trib Force pilot assigned to Petra; witnessed the Glorious Appearing; now residing near the Valley of Jehoshaphat, Israel.

Al B. ("Albie")
Albie (no real name given, named for the town Al Basrah) was a Middle East black market arms dealer who became a believer and a member of the Tribulation Force. He helped Rayford rescue Hattie Durham from a detention center in Colorado in The Mark, using the name Marcus Elbaz. He was killed trying to purchase help from another black market dealer named Mainyu Mazda. He later returned with the resurrected martyrs at the second coming of Jesus.

Bruce Barnes
Before the Rapture, Bruce is the associate pastor at New Hope Village Church, serving with the then-senior pastor Vernon Billings. He has doubted the Bible for most of his life; though he has professed faith in Jesus Christ, he has never truly believed in his heart. When the Rapture takes place and his wife and three children are taken to Heaven, Bruce almost falls into depression and total disbelief. Despite his losses, however, he is determined to start anew. He goes to New Hope Village Church that night and meets a few other members who were also left behind. He finds a video of the pastor explaining the Rapture, from which he learns that it is not too late to be saved, and he commits his life to God.

Bruce befriends Rayford Steele, whom he supplies with a copy of the video. The two of them are soon joined by Rayford's daughter, Chloe, and Cameron "Buck" Williams, and together they form an inner core group, the Tribulation Force. Their mission is to help the lost find Christ and prepare for God's Judgement that is to follow the peace agreement between the Antichrist and Israel. Bruce acts as a spiritual mentor and adviser to the Tribulation Force, explaining the foretold prophecies of what is to come in the final days. Their study reveals that the peace covenant with Israel will mark the beginning of the seven years' war with the Antichrist, known as the Tribulation.

Shortly after returning to the U.S. from a missions trip to India, Bruce is killed when the hospital he was being treated at for an overseas bug gets bombed by the Global Community in order to decimate a nearby rebel compound. He is the first of many casualties the Tribulation Force suffers during the seven-year Tribulation. Even though Bruce is killed relatively early in the Tribulation, the Force he helped establish becomes a driving presence during the global war. It is hinted later in the series that Bruce was poisoned by Nicolae Carpathia's agents and may have died prior to the actual hospital bombing. In the third film based on the books, Left Behind: World at War, Bruce dies from being infected with a virus, and most of the Tribulation Force (all except for Buck) is at his bedside when he dies.

Bruce is resurrected at the Glorious Appearing. In the Millennium World, he and his wife go on Rayford's missionary trip to Egypt to help spread the gospel. He is present at the final battle of the Millennium, watching from a safe distance in Jerusalem with the rest of the Tribulation Force.

In Left Behind: The Kids, Bruce mentors four teenagers, Judd, Lionel, Ryan, and Vicki, who are left behind at the Rapture.

In the original Left Behind films, Bruce is portrayed by Clarence Gilyard, and Arnold Pinnock. In the remake series, he is played by Lance E. Nichols in the remake, Charles Andrew Payne in Left Behind: Rise of the Antichrist and William Gabriel Grier in the spin-off Vanished – Left Behind: Next Generation

Dr. Tsion Ben-Judah
Tsion Ben-Judah, pronounced "Zion", is a Jewish rabbinical scholar and former student of Chaim Rosenzweig. Ben-Judah was commissioned by the Israeli government three years before the Rapture to undertake a study as to how the Jews would recognize the Messiah when he comes. Ben-Judah was beginning to conclude that Jesus of Nazareth met the descriptions of prophecy, but had not committed himself when Christ raptured His church.

Two weeks later, when United Nations secretary-general and Antichrist Nicolae Carpathia and a host of American and Israeli delegates arrived in Israel to sign a seven-year treaty of peace, and at the behest of Buck Williams, Ben-Judah guided Buck (Kirk Cameron) to the Western Wall so that he could speak with the two prophets, Eli and Moishe, men resurrected from Biblical times to bear witness to Christ and begin converting 144,000 Jews to become witnesses for Him.

The meeting with the two witnesses had a profound effect on Ben-Judah, who spoke Nicodemus's words to Jesus, while the two witnesses took turns speaking Jesus' words. Ben-Judah went away from the meeting with much to think and pray about. The next day, Carpathia and the Israelis signed the peace treaty, and shortly after that, Ben-Judah made a one-hour broadcast on GNN International to present his findings. At the end of it, he proclaimed that Jesus was the Messiah and was coming again soon.

Many Israelis and Jews worldwide were outraged at Ben-Judah, but he began to teach and meet with Jews all around the world, as more and more began to convert to Christ. Eighteen months later, his wife and teenage stepchildren were horribly slaughtered and Ben-Judah, the chief suspect, was forced into hiding. Buck was guided to him with hints from the two witnesses at the Wailing Wall, and secretly conducted Ben-Judah out of Israel by way of Egypt, to be flown back to the United States for exile and sanctuary.

Just before this, the Chicago-based Tribulation Force's own leader and teacher, Bruce Barnes, is killed by the Red Horse of the Apocalypse when World War III breaks. Bombs hit the hospital that he was admitted in for over-seas bug that stopped his worldwide encouragement of "Tribulation Saints". Ben-Judah essentially took his place to teach, now reaching out to a worldwide cyber-audience. Ben-Judah, believing himself to be protected by God's power, insisted on returning to Israel to meet with most of the 144,000 witnesses, in order to teach them. Only hours before the Antichrist's resurrection, Tsion had an out-of-body experience, where he witnesses the hosts of Heaven, and the archangel Michael battling Lucifer, in dragon form. The Dragon was cast down to Earth near the end of this experience.

He moves to Petra where Nicolae Carpathia drops two bombs and a missile just minutes after his arrival. There he resides until the Battle of Armageddon, when he leaves to help defend the Holy City. There, both he and Buck Williams are killed by Unity Army soldiers. He is resurrected at the Glorious Appearing, after having reunited with his wife and children in Heaven. In Kingdom Come, he and former fellow Trib Force members lead a missionary trip to Egypt, which Tsion renames Osaze, meaning "loved by God" after turning its inhabitants from Ptah worship. At the end of the Millennium, Tsion is welcomed into Heaven with the rest of the believers.

Vicki Byrne 
Vicki grew up in a trailer park, and hated it because people regularly made fun of her and the others who lived in Prospect Gardens, calling them names such as "Trailer Trash". Her parents smoked, drank, and fought constantly. Every Friday, Vicki would usually have to baby-sit her sister Jeannie, however, occasionally she would ditch her and run off to smoke, drink or do dope with her friends. When Vicki was twelve, a man asked to speak at the dance. Everyone was first irritated, and then quiet as he told all present that Jesus had loved them enough to die for them and He wanted everyone to accept His gift of grace and eternal life. Vicki's parents and her sister all accepted Jesus as their Lord and Savior, along with her brother Eddie in Michigan, while a defiant Vicki refused. Following her parents' conversion, Vicki became even more rebellious and continued to refuse to convert. One night she came back from partying to find the house quiet and was under the impression that they had fallen asleep waiting for her. When she woke up the next morning, all her family were gone because they had been raptured. Though her best friend Shelly wondered what happened, Vicki knew the truth — Christ had come back for His own. She then accepted Christ upon meeting Bruce Barnes, Judd Thompson, Lionel Washington, and Ryan Daley. She spent the next seven years proselytizing, which included interrupting a concert by Z-Van (lead singer of the Four Horsemen and one of Nicolae Carpathia's false messiahs) and speaking to the crowd of thousands. Judd fell in love with her very early in the series and the two were married around a year before the Glorious Appearing, shortly following Vicki's twentieth birthday.

Nicolae Carpathia

Nicolae Jetty Carpathia is the primary antagonist in the Left Behind book series. Within the series, Carpathia is the Antichrist, and leader of the Global Community (G.C.), a world government which he ultimately marshals against the followers of Jesus Christ.

In the Left Behind films, Carpathia is portrayed by Gordon Currie, Randy LaHaye and Bailey Chase. In the Left Behind PC games, he is portrayed by Trevor Parsons.

Fictional biography

Early life and rise to power
According to the plot, Carpathia was born in Cluj County, Romania, the product of genetic engineering and artificial insemination. His mother, Marilena, is unwittingly convinced by a group of Luciferians, whose group she joins, to become the mother of a child who, they assure her, would change the face of the world. Marilena stays with her husband, Sorin, until the baby is born, insisting that her son keep the strong Carpathia name. (In the prequel novel The Rising, it is explained that the name "Nicolae", when translated, means "victory of the people", although this is far from Carpathia's actual goals. His middle name refers to the "jet-black" night on which he was born.)

Through his parents, Carpathia possesses a unique bloodline dating back to Ancient Rome, so he can actually claim to be a Roman descendant. This references both the early Christian belief that the Antichrist would come in the form of a Roman emperor, as well as the current Pre-Millennialist Christian view that the Antichrist will emerge from a "New Roman Empire".

As a young child, Carpathia shows remarkable intelligence and athletic ability, and also proves to be extraordinarily manipulative, able to bend others to his will with relative ease. His handlers arrange for his mother to be eliminated, and Nicolae himself eventually demands the dispatch of his "father", a key to his rise to power. With his advisers and counselors, Carpathia forms a successful import-export business which quickly makes him a millionaire. After he becomes a millionaire, he is then taken by a demon to a desert, probably the Judaean Desert, where he is forced to live without food and water for 40 days. In contrast to Jesus's temptation, Nicolae falls for all three temptations, thus fully confirming that he will soon be the Antichrist. After that, he is then returned to Romania. He quickly grows bored with business and finance and, guided by the "kingmaker" Leon Fortunato, sets his sights on politics.

At the age of 24, Carpathia steps into the political scene as a member of the lower house of the Parliament of Romania. Falling victim to Fortunato's blackmail, the President of Romania resigns, allowing Carpathia to assume power with the unanimous support of the country's parliament. He also finances an attempted invasion of Israel which is thwarted by God.

Shortly thereafter, in the chaos following the Rapture, Carpathia is appointed United Nations Secretary-General. From this office, he converts the U.N. into the Global Community, appointing himself as that government's Supreme Potentate.
 
After Carpathia establishes the Global Community, the governments of the United States, United Kingdom, and Egypt launch an uprising against him, resulting in World War Three. Carpathia allows his enemies to start the war so that the Community can "retaliate" by destroying them.

Carpathia orders cities around the world, including neutral ones, to be obliterated to serve as an example to his enemies. London, Chicago, and other cities are nuked, resulting in millions of casualties, and blamed on the rebels.

Having won the war, and with no government left to oppose him, Carpathia gains full dominion of the earth.

Death and resurrection
After three and a half years in power, Carpathia is assassinated by Chaim Rosenzweig, an Israeli botanist and statesman. He is killed by a lethal head wound from a sword which Rosenzweig had concealed. His demise is short-lived, however, as after three days of lying dead, Carpathia's body is indwelt by Satan himself, thus making Carpathia appear to rise from the dead and further cement his power. Four million people attend his funeral.

Final 3½ years
After his resurrection, Carpathia drops his peaceful facade and reveals himself to be a narcissistic and psychopathic tyrant. He has statues of himself built around the world, which all people are required to bow to. He then enforces the loyalty mark, the prophesied Mark of the Beast, which all are required to wear. Refusal to do either of these activities is made punishable by public execution. Carpathia has the Global Community motto written as "Hail Carpathia, our lord and risin king!". He then wages a genocidal purge against Christians, Jews, Muslims, and secular rebels, going as far as telling an officer in Desecration to behead enemy bodies, even if already dead.    
 
To complete his quest for world domination, Carpathia creates the One World Unity Army, composed of all G.C. military presence on the planet. Their mission is to destroy the remnant stronghold of Petra and take over the city of Jerusalem as the world's new capital, following the supernatural destruction of New Babylon. He also gathers the armies of the world at the valley of Armageddon for the battle with Jesus Christ and his army.

In accordance with the series' interpretation of biblical prophecy, Carpathia is overthrown with the return of Jesus, who cast him, along with his false prophet Fortunato, into the Lake of Fire to suffer for all eternity. Before his eternal sentence is carried out, Satan is cast out of Carpathia, rendering Carpathia to his rotting corpse-like remains, the state his body would have been in had Satan not resurrected him prior. He then kneels before Christ and declares him the Christ after Jesus judged him for all his crimes and sins against humanity and God. He also admits, at the feet of Jesus, that his entire life was a waste and that he rebelled against a God that he never knew loved him. Unlike Fortunato, who attempted to struggle with Michael the Archangel out of his sentence, Carpathia accepted his fate out of his own guilt and shame, and simply covered his eyes as he passively allowed the archangel to throw him in.

One thousand years later
One thousand years later, a brief glimpse of Carpathia and Leon Fortunato is seen as the Lake of Fire opens to swallow up Satan. Carpathia is still writhing in agony as he is tortured in fire and brimstone, repeating over and over that Jesus is Lord. The scene closes, and Carpathia's suffering—along with that of his master and his underling—is resumed for all eternity.

Carpathianism 
Carpathianism is a fictional religion established by Leon to worship Nicolae Carpathia, leaving it as the only legal religion on Earth. Failure to comply results in death. The religion lasts for three and a half years before meeting its downfall at the Second Coming of Christ.

Carpathianism draws heavily from the narratives and traditions of Christianity, Judaism, and Islam. After his death and resurrection, Carpathia proclaims himself God in the desecrated Temple of the Holy of Holies, an act that is considered blasphemous in all three Abrahamic religions. He orders golden statues of himself to be placed prominently and worshiped three times a day. This touches on the golden calf story found in both the Old Testament and the Quran. In reference to the Book of Revelation, Carpathia introduces the mandatory mark known as the Mark of the Beast.

Annie Christopher
Angela "Annie" Christopher grew up in an atheist home in Canada. After losing some friends in the rapture she began searching but became a fan of Nicolae Carpathia. While she was in the air going to New Babylon to work for him, the Wrath of the Lamb earthquake hit killing all her family.

She is described as having short black hair and being athletically built.

In New Babylon she became a believer and meets David Hassid. In Assassins, David introduces her to Mac McCullum and Abdullah Smith, Carpathia's pilots who are also believers. She and David get engaged but can't marry till they escape.

On the day of Nicolae Carpathia's funeral/resurrection, she is killed by the ensuing storm – by a painless lightning strike. The death is not confirmed until the book The Mark when Hannah Palemoon finds her body in the morgue, then takes David to see it.

Annie is also mentioned in Left Behind: The Kids when Judd and Lionel are at Carpathia's funeral, and Judd witnesses her death by lightning.

Ryan Daley
His mother and father, unbelievers, died because of the events after the rapture. He was the last one out of the four to become a believer due to his atheist background and grief in his parents loss. He was best friends with Rayford "Raymie" Steele Jr., Rayford Steele's son, and the two often had much fun together. Ryan finds a dog and names it Phoenix early on in the series. He and Lionel often clashed to the point of a brawl, yet they were still very close. In The Search, following the death of  Bruce Barnes Ryan is kidnapped along with a girl named Darrion Stahley. He helps Darrion escape her captors and she also become a believer following these events. After her mother's death, Darrion remains with members of the Young Trib Force until Glorious Appearing. In the book "On the Run", Ryan accompanies Judd to Israel where Ryan saves Judd's life after Judd is captured by the GC for having a tape containing the truth about the murders of Tsion Ben-Judah's family. Ryan died a couple days after the Wrath of the Lamb earthquake, having had a chunk of debris fall on him, causing his legs to become paralyzed and a wound in his back to become badly infected, from which he died soon afterward.

Tyrola ("T") Mark Delanty
Tyrola Mark Delanty became a believer and a member of the Tribulation Force. He was in charge of the airstrip that Ken Ritz had used. Rayford Steele met him when the plague of locusts struck, attacking all unbelievers. T also helped Buck Williams and Chaim Rosenzweig escape from Israel on a plane that crashes in Greece, killing him.

Hattie Durham
Before the Rapture, Hattie was a senior flight attendant, young and beautiful, working for Pan-Continental Airlines. She seemed to be attracted to Pan-Con pilot Rayford Steele, perhaps wanting an affair with him. Late into the night, it was stated halfway to London from O'Hare, many awake to find that loved ones and others have vanished, leaving behind everything material, ranging from clothes and hearing aids to tooth fillings. Terrified from the events, Hattie informs Rayford about the event, thinking he does not know what has just happened. When they return to Chicago, Hattie begs Rayford to stay with her, but he refused, wanting to check on his family. A few days later she arrives at his house, pleading for him to come with her, but he tells her he found what he was missing, Jesus Christ, and that the disappearances was the Rapture. However, she declines, thinking he has gone crazy after losing his wife and son, and leaves without him.

Hattie, who convinced Buck to introduce her to Nicolae Carpathia, eventually becomes Carpathia's personal secretary, and later his lover. Rayford and the other members of the Tribulation Force attempt to convince her that Carpathia is evil, but she refuses to listen. After becoming pregnant with Nicolae's child and being engaged to him, Carpathia attempts to poison her, but the child takes the brunt of the poison and dies. Hattie is eventually sent to the Belgium Facility for Female Rehabilitation (BFFR, or "Buffer") when Carpathia realizes she would be a liability to him. She is rescued by members of the Tribulation Force. She is then convinced of the truth of God's Word, and she becomes a devout Christian. She is eventually killed by Leon Fortunato, who calls down a bolt of lightning to vaporize her.

Hattie is resurrected at the Glorious Appearing of Jesus Christ, to the great delight of Rayford and the rest of God's followers. She is awarded a crown from Jesus Himself, who praises her for her bravery in the face of certain death. She also appears briefly in Kingdom Come, as she is among those present at Mac McCullum's thousandth birthday party and is assumedly with the rest of the Trib Force as they gather to watch the end of the Millennium. Hattie is played by Chelsea Noble in the films, Nicky Whelan in the 2014 film, and Kathryn Kohut in Left Behind: Rise of the Antichrist.

Gerald Fitzhugh

Gerald Fitzhugh is the President of the United States at the time of the Rapture. In the first novel, he is shown to be openly welcoming of Nicolae Carpathia, but gradually become more suspicious.

In Tribulation Force, with his power and countries independence fading, Fitzhugh plans with the British and Egyptian governments to launch a worldwide offensive against Carpathia and the Global Community, with help from various militias. When a combined British and Egyptian attack on New Babylon backfires, the conflict escalates into World War III. Cities around the world are destroyed in the war, and Fitzhugh himself is killed by a Global Community blitzkrieg on Washington D.C.

In the film Left Behind: World at War, Fitzhugh is played by Louis Gossett Jr.

Leon Fortunato

Leon Fortunato is the False Prophet, and he is a key member of the inner circle of Nicolae Carpathia, businessman, financier, politician, and Antichrist.

In his native Italy, Leon grew up fascinated with the trappings of Catholicism, although he never truly believed in any of the Church's teachings; Leon simply liked the glory. He was fond of dressing in ornate and flowing robes and strutting all over his college campus. After being expelled, Fortunato grew fond of becoming a kingmaker, preferring to work behind the scenes to elevate his chosen candidates to any positions of power they wanted. Carpathia, wanting to enter politics himself, employed Leon on his staff, and grew to value the man's counseling; although Leon tended to be clingy and sycophantic, he taught Carpathia humility (or more specifically, how to feign humility) which proved to be very valuable on the world political stage.

When Carpathia created the Global Community, he appointed Leon to the position of Supreme Commander, the deputy to Nicolae's Supreme Potentate.

Throughout his relationship with Carpathia, Fortunato continues to fawn over the man, a fact that seems to be driven home when Leon died in the Wrath of the Lamb earthquake. He had been buried and crushed in the rubble of the GC headquarters complex and his mother was calling him home, when he heard a voice – Carpathia's – calling out: "LEONARDO, COME FORTH!" in imitation of a command that Jesus Christ gave to Lazarus. Leon is revived, and then becomes more faithful than ever to Carpathia, believing that Carpathia is a god incarnate. Like Nicolae, Leon regularly communicated with the 'spirit world'; it is implied that both men shared the same spiritual 'guide' – Satan himself.

Later, when Carpathia is assassinated by Dr. Rosenzweig and resurrected as prophesied, Fortunato becomes even more important, and is Carpathia's go-to man and second-in-command. Leon becomes the Most High Reverend Father of the new religion of Carpathianism. He is imbued with power from Lucifer and is able to kill believers (such as Annie Christopher) with the Satanic ability to call down fire from the sky, either as lightning from a cloudless blue sky (as he did in killing three opposing sub-potentates during Carpathia's funeral) or as a single ball of flame (in the slaying of Hattie Durham), and is officially identified as the False Prophet that aids the Antichrist. In The Remnant, he is given the task of training a legion of wizards, priests and miracle-workers, who are also bestowed with various similar demonic abilities.

Fortunato's "glory days" are short-lived, however, ending in Glorious Appearing with the return of Jesus. In Fortunato's final moments of life, he reveals his true self: a babbling, incoherent coward. He knelt before Jesus and acknowledged him as Lord without hesitation. As Jesus laid out his crimes against humanity and the will of God, he pleaded for mercy and forgiveness, even attempting to reject Carpathia and Satan, pledging allegiance to him. However, it was already too late for Leon and Jesus sentenced him for eternity in the lake of fire.  Unlike Carpathia, who accepted his fate, Leon struggled with Michael as the archangel threw him into the lake of fire.

The world catches a final glimpse of both Carpathia and Fortunato at the end of the Millennium World, when Satan himself is thrown into the Lake of Fire. Fortunato is writhing in pain and shouting "Jesus is Lord!" The scene closes and Fortunato's suffering is resumed for all eternity.

Critical Reception
Leon Fortunato has been described as Nicolae Carpathia's sidekick. Because he is an Italian American, he has been cited as an example of the cultural diversity of the novels' characters. In The Mark, Fortunato is revealed to be the Left Behind series' incarnation of the False Prophet described in the Book of Revelation. One critic has condemned the silliness of Fortunato's titles as being anti-Catholic and populist. There have also been complaints about the farcical characterization of Leon Fortunato when he suffers from the pain of a hemorrhoid in Desecration.

David Hassid
Formerly assigned to Global Community Headquarters Palace, New Babylon, United Holy Land States as Director of Purchasing; oversees all purchases for the GC and the hangar and cockpit crew of the Condor 216 and the Phoenix 216.

Hassid is a Jew who worked in New Babylon in the global government headed by Supreme Potentate and Antichrist Nicolae Carpathia. Very quickly, he becomes a believer in Christ, and is spotted by Mac McCullum in the GC shelter right after the Wrath of the Lamb earthquake.

Hassid works in communications and is considered one of the top computer experts alive. His service to the Tribulation Force is to confound communications, tip off the Trib Force and arrange for some goods to be "mislaid" and end up in the hands of the Tribulation saints.

Immediately after Carpathia's assassination, Hassid had to work with artist Guy Blod, who was making a huge statue of Carpathia. Hassid and Blod clash, but eventually, Hassid realizes he must get along with Blod or risk discipline and possible exposure as a Tribulation saint; also, it is not very Christ-like to be promoting enmity. Hassid's love interest, Phoenix 216 cargo chief Annie Christopher dies as a result of False Prophet Leon Fortunato's Satan-imbued ability to call down lightning from heaven to kill any non-Carpathianist. David (at some point during this time) vomits on Carpathia during a meeting. Hassid begins grooming Chang Wong, a young man from China who is also very technically gifted, as his protégé and replacement when Hassid must leave; the mark of loyalty is now required of employees in New Babylon, and Chang, given the mark unwillingly, has both the mark of the Beast and the mark of God's on his forehead.

After his death is faked, Hassid starts setting up communications in Petra, to prepare for the remnant of Israel's arrival during the fifth year of the Tribulation.

Hassid is killed by two GC MIAs at Petra, before the remnant actually arrives in Petra.

Judd Thompson Jr. 

Judd Thompson, Jr is a fictional character and one of the four main protagonists in the Left Behind: The Kids series of novels by Tim LaHaye and Jerry B. Jenkins. He, along with, Vicki, Lionel, and Ryan, were the first original members of The Young Tribulation Force.
Judd was born to a Christian family that always had faith towards Christ. His name originally came from his father, and he has hated it ever since. On the night on the rapture, Judd decided that he was going to run away. He had stolen money from his father's credit card and lied to both of his parents, telling them that he was going to the library to study for his schoolwork. Instead, Judd went to the O'Hare airport and boarded a plane that was heading to London, England.

After hearing about the strange disappearances of his fellow passengers, Judd realized that what he had been told in his church before was true. Jesus had come back and he had been left behind. Afterwards, Judd got off his plane and met up with Bruce Barnes. Bruce was a pastor, believer, and the only member of the staff that had been left behind. He initially met other Left Behind protagonists Vicki Byrne, Lionel Washington, and Ryan Daley. As the four earned a liking to each other, they formed The Young Tribulation Force. 
He allowed Vicki, Ryan, and Lionel to stay at his house until they were forced to flee because of the Global Community. Bruce and Judd go on a few international trips, the last of these was taken shortly before Bruce's death. Following the earthquake and Ryan's death the Young Trib force live in a cave until they can escape to a safer hideout. Zeke then gives them a new ID. He resists going to the schoolhouse, as he and Vicki have a massive falling out. He eventually goes in order to warn the kids about Wormwood. Due to their disagreements Vicki lets him and Lionel go to the Gala in Israel. The trip was meant to last a week but actually lasted around three years. A girl in Israel fell in love with him but however she was shot. Before she died, she wrote him a letter saying how she felt like there was somebody back home that he loved. He realized she meant Vicki. He proposed to Vicki (he always wanted to)after his return, and they marry about a year before the Glorious Appearing, where he and Vicki are both in Jerusalem.

Peter Mathews
Peter Mathews was the archbishop of Cincinnati, Ohio, at the time of the Rapture. He was described as a very traditional Roman Catholic at this time, although he rapidly embraced dramatic changes to the faith after the Rapture. Shortly after the Rapture, Mathews participated in key meetings to establish the Global Community Faith (shortly after, it was renamed Enigma Babylon One World Faith) and also was elected to replace the pope John XXIV who had been raptured.

Calling himself Supreme Pontiff and Pontifex Maximus, Mathews became the leader of Enigma Babylon, adopted the name Peter the Second, and considered the new faith organization to be at least as important as the Global Community and himself an equal of Supreme Potentate and Antichrist Nicolae Carpathia.

Mathews is later assassinated—stabbed with icicles from an ice sculpture—by the ten "kings" that Carpathia had appointed to lead the world under his rule.

Montgomery Cleburn ("Mac") McCullum
Pilot for Carpathia; Good friend of Rayford 'Ray' Steele, chief Tribulation Force pilot assigned to Petra; witness to the Glorious Appearing; residing near the Valley of Jehoshaphat.

Walter Moon

Walter Moon is a supporting antagonist in the Left Behind series. He was a prominent member of the Global Community who was promoted to the role of Supreme Commander after Leon Fortunato's promotion to High Reverend Father of Carpathianism and Jim Hickman's death. Moon is given the title though it has no real meaning at this point in the story. Before that, he was Director of Security for the Global Community. After his death, the Supreme Commander position was dissolved.

Moon begged Carpathia to be the first to bear his mark and swore that he would bear it with endless pride. In Desecration, he got his wish when he received the mark of the beast along with his fellow members of the Global Community cabinet – Suhail Akbar and Viv Ivins – at the Temple Mount a day before Nicolae Carpathia committed the abomination of desolation. He received a dark negative six on his forehead for his mark of loyalty. Carpathia expressed his disappointment with him when he expressed some misgivings to Carpathia's plans to attack the Christians and Jews who are assembled at the Mount of Olives, Mizpe Ramon, Masada and Petra by referring to Micah's threat that an attack would bring back the plague of the sores or turn the waters of the world into blood. The final straw for Carpathia was his failure to promptly terminate a hijacked broadcast of Tsion Ben-Judah delivering a message from Global Community's own television network. Angered by the appearance of Ben-Judah on television, a choleric Carpathia shot Moon to death when Moon's frantic pleas to the network failed to terminate the broadcast.

Hannah Palemoon
Hannah Palemoon is a fictional character in the Left Behind series of novels created by Tim LaHaye and Jerry Jenkins. She is a Native American nurse working for the Global Community in New Babylon.  She met David Hassid when he passed out from sun-stroke while looking for Annie Christopher. Hannah later escapes New Babylon with David Hassid, Mac McCullum and Abdullah Smith. She and Leah also serves as a nurse during Operation Eagle. After a feud by e-mail with David, she goes with Rayford, Mac, and Leah Rose to the city of Petra to investigate a disturbance. She is grief-stricken to find that David was killed by two MIA GC soldiers, and has a hand in killing both men so as to keep Petra safe for the Remnant to move in. She goes back to the US and stays with a co-op flyer and his wife till she moves to Petra with Leah, where she helps tend the wounded with her medical expertise. She is one of the Tribulation Force members still alive at the Glorious Appearing.

Steve Plank
Prior to the Rapture, Plank is the executive editor of Global Weekly magazine, and the boss of Cameron "Buck" Williams. Within two weeks of the Rapture, Plank accepts a post as press secretary for rising international political leader Nicolae Carpathia, and nominates Buck to take his place as senior editor.

Plank falls under Carpathia's spell and serves him faithfully until he becomes surplus to Nicolae's needs. He disappears for several years, presumably lost in the Great Wrath of The Lamb earthquake when the Global Community Headquarters in New Babalyon collapsed.

Plank resurfaces shortly after the midpoint of the Tribulation, using the alias Pinkerton Stephens, and a believer in Christ.  Rayford Steele and Albie encounter him in The Mark working undercover as a GC operative in Pueblo, Colorado. He is badly disfigured and wears a prosthetic to hide the fact that most of his face is missing as a result of injuries caused by the Wrath of the Lamb earthquake.  Though he is hideously disfigured, the seal of the believer is visible on his forehead. He says that he had already been convinced before the earthquake, and that he "was praying the prayer as the building came down."

After revealing his true identity to Rayford and Albie, he helps them rescue Hattie Durham from the very facility where he has been working undercover.

Plank next appears in The Remnant, when the GC brass order all personnel without Carpathia's mark of loyalty obtain it immediately.  After agonizing in prayer, Plank surrenders himself to the GC, refusing to take the mark.  Even while choosing to place his head on the guillotine at the loyalty mark processing center, Plank uses wit and disarming cooperation as he is positioned for execution, bantering good-naturedly with his executioners, and trading quips about the stand-in executioner owing him a favour for assisting in operating the guillotine.

Razor
Razor is a Mexican military officer in his mid-twenties at the San Diego Tribulation Force fortress. He is introduced in Armageddon shortly after Chloe Steele Williams disappears. He is very military-like, and refers to men that he speaks with as "Sirs," which he eventually quits doing after Cameron "Buck" Williams tells him enough times.

He acquired his name from a snowmobile accident in Minnesota before the Rapture when he hit some razor wire and should have died.

He leads a band of about four men and a woman at the safe house. They discovered Chloe's Uzi and ski mask near two platoons of Global Community Peacekeepers. By that point, they had assumed the worst and knew she had been captured.

Ken Ritz
Ken Ritz, a fictional character of the Left Behind series, is a private pilot. Once a commercial airline pilot, Ritz was sacked because he was too much of a stickler for safety. He went into charter business, and by the time of the Rapture, he owned a small fleet of aircraft based at Chicago-area airports.

The second day after the Rapture, Ritz provides Buck Williams with a flight as close to New York City as possible. The conversation they share is instrumental in the start of Ritz's journey to salvation, although the novels do not indicate any further services by Ritz to Buck until some 18 months into the Tribulation. Then, Ritz flies Buck to Israel where he locates and rescues Tsion Ben-Judah, and Ritz flies them safely back to America.

Ritz is badly injured in the Wrath of the Lamb earthquake, when an airplane wing hits the back of his head. However, given the urgency of the circumstances, he flies Buck to Minneapolis to rescue Chloe Steele Williams before she is taken by Global Community operatives to be used as a bargaining chip. He manages to fly Buck and Chloe back to Chicago, and is shortly afterward employed to take Buck to Denver to pluck Hattie Durham from the GC. On arrival at the safe house to begin the flight to Denver, he shows that he has become a believer.

In Apollyon, Ritz is killed by a GC bullet to the head while racing with Ben-Judah, Chloe, and Buck to board a waiting plane at Jerusalem Airport to return to the United States. The catalyst for the shooting is the detected theft of GC Chopper One to pluck the threesome from the roof of Israeli botanist and statesman Chaim Rosenzweig's house.

Later, Chloe and Buck name their child Kenneth Bruce Williams in honor of Ken. He is resurrected in Glorious Appearing with the other martyred saints.

Leah Rose
Former head nurse at Arthur Young Memorial Hospital in Palatine, Illinois, she helped Cameron "Buck" Williams get Ken Ritz out without compromising the Tribulation Force's cover, and after helping deliver Hattie Durham's stillborn baby that was fathered by Antichrist Nicolae Carpathia, abandons her now-compromised job and must request sanctuary at the Trib Force safe house.

Leah and Rayford Steele clash as they stumble at trying to work together, their personalities colliding. Leah's first Trib Force undercover mission, at the midpoint of the Tribulation, takes her to Belgium to try to communicate with Hattie at the Belgium Facility for Female Rehabilitation (BFFR), or "Buffer." There, she meets Ming Toy, another believer with a strategic position inside the Global Community. Ming helps Leah avoid suspicion and incarceration, and Leah returns to Illinois.

She helps out at Operation Eagle as a nurse, and then goes to live with a co-op pilot and his wife when the Chicago safe house is compromised.

She and Hannah Palemoon move to Petra and help run the hospital there. Leah also helps Rayford Steele in Glorious Appearing after an almost fatal ATV wreck. She is among the few believers left alive when Jesus Christ returns to earth.

Chaim Rosenzweig
Israeli botanist and statesman, discoverer of a formula that made Israeli desert bloom, former Global Weekly Man of the Year; murderer of Carpathia; leader of the million-plus Jewish remnant at Petra; witness to the Glorious Appearing; now residing near the Valley of Jehoshaphat.

Chaim was Carpathia's friend for the first half of the tribulation; Chaim believed in him with all of his heart. However, through infiltration of the GC Palace by the Trib Force and Buck & Tsion's conversations with him, Chaim was led to murder Carpathia. He faked a stroke, got a wheelchair, and hid a hand-filed blade in the handle. When Rayford Steele accidentally shot the Saber, Carpathia staggered back, tripped, and fell backwards, right into the blade being held in Chaim's hands. Chaim later became a believer, and led the Jewish Remnant at Petra under the alias "Micah" (made from the letters of his original name).

In the Left Behind films, he is portrayed by Colin Fox and David LeReaney.

Irene Steele
Before the Rapture, Irene is married to the series' chief protagonist, Rayford Steele. Together they have two children, Chloe and Raymie. After becoming a born-again Christian, Irene becomes desperate for her family to have the same salvation she has. She eventually gets through to her son, Raymie, who becomes a Christian and helps her cope with Rayford's and Chloe's indecisiveness toward God. She even counsels Rayford's parents, who are struggling with Alzheimer's, leading them both to salvation before their deaths. Through the counseling of her friend Jackie, Irene tries to turn the rest of her family towards Christ, but to no avail.

Rayford becomes more and more distant over the years, and Irene suspects he is having an affair. Chloe leaves home to go to college, having never let go of her "show me" attitude. Just as Irene is at the height of her desperation, the Rapture occurs. Irene and Raymie are among the countless millions of believers who are taken up into the House of God, where the Bema Seat Judgment takes place. At first, Irene is nervous when her works are tested by the fire because of her short time as a Christian, but her efforts are ultimately praised by Jesus.

After the Marriage Supper of the Lamb, Irene and the rest of the raptured saints wait and enjoy life in Heaven. On Earth, the cosmic battle of the ages takes place as the Tribulation ravages the planet. Irene returns with the heavenly hosts at the Glorious Appearing of Christ, reuniting with her husband, her daughter, and her young grandson, Kenny Bruce Williams. She is also thrilled to meet Cameron "Buck" Williams, Chloe's husband.

In Kingdom Come, Irene and her husband lead a missionary trip to Egypt, where they lead many to salvation during the Millennium World. She is present at the final battle at the end of the Millennium where Christ overthrows evil once and for all and welcomes all believers into the Kingdom of Heaven for eternity.

Rayford Steele

Rayford Steele was a former 747 pilot for Pan-Con Airlines, lost his first wife (Irene) and only son (Raymie Jr.) in the Rapture. Shortly after that, he became a born-again believer, became an employee of Global Community, and flew Carpathia's private jet until his cover was blown. His daughter Chloe also became a believer, and he has a grandson Kenny Bruce; he lost his second wife Amanda in a plane crash; original member of the Tribulation Force; wanted for supposedly murdering Nicolae Carpathia; witness to the Glorious Appearing; now residing near the Valley of Jehoshaphat. He was portrayed by Brad Johnson in the films, Nicolas Cage in the 2014 film, and Kevin Sorbo in Left Behind: Rise of the Antichrist.

Raymie Steele
Raymie is the second child and only son of Rayford and Irene Steele. He was raptured, along with his mother, when Jesus returned before the Tribulation. Throughout the Left Behind Series, he frequently comes to the mind of Rayford—who was left behind due to his unbelief. He is also the best friend of Ryan Daley. Ryan is a member of the Young Tribulation Force in the Left Behind The Kids Series.

In Kingdom Come, he works in Jerusalem with his older sister, Chloe Steele, who was executed during the Tribulation for her belief, and her husband, Buck Williams, who also died during the Tribulation during the final battle in Jerusalem. During the Millennium World, Chloe and Buck are in charge of a massive childcare center, whose speaking guests include Noah and King David.

Dishelved with the death of a fellow co-worker at the age of one-hundred, Raymie founds the Millennium Force, a small group dedicated to sharing the Word of God with the undecideds during the Millennium World. When his nephew, Kenny Bruce Williams, attempts to infiltrate a Luciferian organization called The Other Light, Raymie becomes worried by the level of the devotion the "mole" is showing. He later kicks Kenny out of the Force after evidence surfaces that indicates that Kenny has "switched sides." Kenny is later vindicated, however, and Raymie is overjoyed to welcome his nephew back into the Force.

He is assumedly present at Cameron's estate during the final battle of the Millennium. He, like other believers, is welcomed into Paradise at the end of both the Millennium and time itself.

As he had a Glorified  Body, he never aged, while his nephew did and became older.

Jonathan Stonagal 
Jonathan Stonagal is a powerful, corrupt, and highly influential American financier with links to Viv Ivins' Luciferian organization. Apart from controlling most of the world's largest financial institutions and being the richest man in history, he also owns the genetic engineering company that artificially inseminated Nicolae Carpathia's mother Marilena. As her son Nicolae comes of age, Stonagal becomes one of his mentors, financing his rise in the corporate world.

At his first meeting as United Nations Secretary-General (at the end of Left Behind Book 1), Carpathia executes Stonagal with a revolver, believing that his usefulness has expired. The same bullet that kills Stonagal also kills Joshua Todd-Cothran, the head of the London Stock Exchange, believed responsible for plotting an attempt on Buck Williams' life earlier in the book as well as murdering many of his acquaintances. Carpathia then brainwashes everyone in the room (except Williams, who was protected by God) into believing that Stonagal shot himself and Todd-Cothran in remorse for the assassinations.

In Tribulation Force (Book 2), Carpathia tells Williams that he was named the sole beneficiary in Stonagal's will, though Stonagal's family members will receive massive payoffs to silence them. This effectively bestowed on Carpathia the financial resources and clout needed for his intended takeover of the world's media and information networks, granting him a media monopoly.

Eleazar Tiberias
Eleazer Tiberias is one of the elders at Petra, who helps Micah (aka Chaim Rosenzweig) run the operations of the city of the remnant. Eleazar's wife was converted to Christianity before she died of an illness, and Eleazar, who otherwise loved his wife greatly, rejected his dying wife's pleas to convert, and instead disowned her and slipped into depression. The events of the Rapture happen; Eleazar listens to Tsion Ben-Judah's television broadcast on the Messiah and is converted. Eleazar is one of the 144,000 evangelical converts in the book. Eleazar's daughter is Naomi Tiberias.

Naomi Tiberias
Naomi Tiberias is the teenage daughter of Eleazar Tiberias, one of the elders at Petra, who help Micah (aka Chaim Rosenzweig) run the operations of the city of the remnant. Naomi's mother was converted to Christianity before she died of an illness.

Naomi is one of the "techies" in Petra, and assists Chang Wong in setting up technology within Petra. After helping rescue Chang from New Babylon they become very close, but decide to postpone marriage until the Millennium Kingdom.

She and her father take in single women and families after the return of Christ.

Joshua Todd-Cothran 
Joshua Todd-Cothran is the head of the London Stock Exchange and, like his colleague Jonathan Stonagal, is a highly influential financier. So influential, in fact, that award-winning journalist Cameron "Buck" Williams believes he is responsible for having many professional acquaintances assassinated. Williams also suspects Todd-Cothran had framed him for the car bomb murder of Scotland Yard agent and close friend Alan Tompkins, who had grown suspicious of Todd-Cothran's practices.

At his first meeting as United Nations Secretary-General (at the end of Left Behind), Nicolae Carpathia executes Stonagal and Todd-Cothran with a single bullet that passes through Stonagal's head, then Todd-Cothran's.  Carpathia explains to Buck that he was fulfilling his promise to take care of Buck's problem, knowing that Todd-Cothran was responsible for plotting the attempt on Williams' life earlier in the book as well as the assassinations. Carpathia then brainwashes everyone in the room (except Buck, who was protected by God) into believing that it was Stonagal who shot himself and Todd-Cothran in remorse for the assassinations.

Ming Toy
Ming Toy is the older sister of Chang Wong. She was a former Global Community employee working at Buffer who is a believer.

She was formerly married but left a widow during the early years of the Tribulation. She joined the Tribulation Force in "The Mark", escaping Buffer when the "mark of loyalty" was being tested out on prisoners.

She traveled to China under the guise of a Global Community Peacekeeper officer named Chang Chow in order to find her parents who became believers, and discovered that while her mother was still alive, her father died a martyr.

She later fell in love with and married Ree Woo in "Armageddon". She made it to the Glorious Appearing.

Lionel Washington
His whole family were the most devout Christians he knew, and he pretended to go along with them. The only one he could connect with was his Uncle André, who would turn into a drunk and a gambler one week and a "devout Christian" the next. All of his family disappeared in the Rapture except André, who died after being shot by LeRoy Banks and being caught up in a fire in his apartment complex. Lionel became a Christian and acknowledged that Jesus had raptured his church. He spent the next seven years proselytizing, spending most of his time with Judd and Bruce Barnes. He had to amputate his left arm after it was crushed in a rock slide while he and Judd were traveling back to the rest of the Young Tribulation Force from their adventures in the Middle East, but gained it back when Jesus returned at the end of the series. He came to stay in Petra after the marriage of Judd and Vicki where he was best man. At the end of the series he went to Jerusalem with the other believers.
Lionel is the only primary character from the main protagonists in the Left Behind: The Kids series to appear in the adult novels. This occurs in Left Behind when he speaks to Buck Williams, who at the time worked for the same paper as Lionel's mother, Lucinda Washington.

Amanda White
The second wife of Rayford Steele, whom married him in Tribulation Force. Engaged and married on the same day as Chloe and Buck.

She died in a plane crash in Soul Harvest. Thought to be subversive after death due to messages planted by Hattie Durham, who later clears Amanda's name when poisoned by Nicolae.
She appears in Glorious Appearing with Rayford's first wife Irene.

Sam Sorbo will portray Amanda in the upcoming Left Behind: Rise of the Anti-Christ.

Cameron ("Buck") Williams
Cameron ("Buck") Williams, is an award-winning journalist, former senior publisher of Global Community Weekly, who became a believer before the murder of Jonathan Stonagal. He married his wife Chloe in a double wedding with Rayford Steele (his new father-in-law) and Amanda White, has one son Kenny Bruce Williams. Author of the underground cyber-magazine "The Truth". He died less than 24 hours before the Glorious Appearing. He and his wife were gifted to teach children during the millennium, in a place called Children of the Tribulation (COT), which was located in Israel; towards the end their son Kenny expanded it to Greece. He is portrayed in the films by Kirk Cameron, Chad Michael Murray in the 2014 film, and by Greg Parrow in Left Behind: Rise of the Antichrist.

Chloe Steele Williams

Chloe Steele Williams, daughter of Rayford Steele and wife of Buck Williams, was a former college student. She lost her mother and brother in the rapture, became a believer in Christ, married Buck and had a son called Kenneth Bruce Williams after Ken Ritz, the pilot, and Bruce Barnes, who led Buck, Rayford, and Chloe (CEO of the International Commodity co-op) to Christ. She was beheaded shortly before the Battle of Armageddon. She is portrayed by Janaya Stephens in the films, Cassi Thomson in the 2014 film, and Sarah Fisher in Left Behind: Rise of the Antichrist.

Kenneth Bruce Williams
Kenny Bruce Williams is the son of Cameron "Buck" Williams and Chloe Steele Williams, named after martyred believers Ken Ritz and Bruce Barnes. He is born during the Tribulation, in the book Apollyon. He is taken care of by his grandfather, Rayford Steele, when Buck goes to Jerusalem to help defend it in Armageddon. He is reunited with his parents in Glorious Appearing. Jesus promises Buck and Chloe that because they lost Kenny they would be repaid by the hundredfold. Because of that they start a massive daycare ministry called COT(Children of the Tribulation), which focused on teaching children and trying to show them that Jesus is the only way. Kenny is the first child in COT.

Ninety-some years later, Kenny is working at COT and is now living on his own. When one of the workers, Cendrillon Jospin dies at one hundred, It creates an uproar among the believers since only unbelievers die. Not wanting anyone to follow Cendrillon's path, but knowing many will, Kenny, Raymie Steele, Bahira Ababneh, and Zaki Ababneh form the Millennium Force, a branch off of the Tribulation Force.

At Cendrillon's funeral, Kenny (who has the only non-glorified body of the four) meets Cendrillon's cousins from France, who are in deep with TOL (The Other Light), a secret organization that worships Lucifer. He goes under cover for the  Millennium Force. He also meets Ekaterina Risto and falls in love with her. When a friend of Zaki, Qasim Marid, goes undercover for the Force without their permission, they all start to wonder where his loyalties lie. When Kenny goes to France, he meets up with the Johpins and their other cousin, Nicolette. They head to Jordan where Kenny is seen by Abdullah Smith. After being accused of switching loyalties, he is kicked out of the Millennium Force, deserted by Ekaterina, and hardly believed by his parents.

This causes Kenny's life to fall apart, and while he is extremely lonely, he trusts in God to deliver him in the end. Kat finally goes to talk to Kenny and realizes that he is innocent. Qasim is discovered as the real infiltrator at COT and fired, eventually dying at the age of one hundred along with the Johpins and Nicolette. Kenny later marries Kat and they have eight sons and six daughters. They go on to establish a branch of COT in Greece, as was Kat's lifelong dream.

As he is a natural, Kenny ages over the course of the Millennium, with both he and Kat unable to walk without walking sticks. Both Kenny and his wife are present at the final battle of the Millennium and they, along with all the other believers, are welcomed into heaven.

Chang Wong
The brother of Ming Toy, he is 17 at the time of Global Community Supreme Potentate and Antichrist Nicolae Carpathia's temporary death, he is groomed by David Hassid to replace him as the Tribulation Force's mole in the GC Headquarters Palace in New Babylon. Hassid, who is a believer, cannot take the mark of the beast and so he flees, faking his death.

Chang is pressured by his parents, who are Carpathia loyalists, to take the mark, but Chang violently protests this as he is a believer in Jesus Christ. He is later drugged by his father, who forces the mark on Chang while the young man is incapacitated; Chang fears for his soul as a result of this, although he is reassured that he cannot be held responsible for taking the mark since it was forced on him against his will.

Even though Chang appears to have the mark of loyalty, believers can still see the mark of God on him. He is able to continue as the Trib Force's mole until God strikes New Babylon with darkness; then he is rescued and relocated to Petra to work with the Remnant of Israel. There, he is prayed for by Tsion and others, and his mark of loyalty is miraculously removed by God.

Chang becomes romantically involved with Naomi Tiberias, but they decide to postpone marriage until a point beyond Glorious Appearing.

Gustaf Zuckermandel, Jr. (Zeke)
Gustaf Zuckermandel, Jr. (aka: Zeke or Little Zeke) is a fictional character in the Left Behind series. He is described as a "fleshy" young man in thick-soled, square-toed, black motorcycle boots, black jeans, black T-shirt, and black leather vest.  He is the only son of Gustaf Zuckermandel Sr. (aka: "Big Zeke"). Zeke and his father were first introduced in Assassins.

After having lost his mother and two younger sisters in a fire the night of the rapture, he and his father were converted by a trucker stopping at their gas station. They started going to a secret church in Arlington Heights and running a black market gas station. Zeke became a disguise specialist/master forger for the Tribulation Force and later joined them in Chicago, after his dad was arrested for black marketeering. He transformed Chaim Rosenzweig into Micah in Desecration. He was one of the few believers left alive when Christ, with his armies, returned to earth. Shortly after, he is reunited with his father, who returned from heaven with the armies of Christ.

He appears twice, albeit briefly, in the final novel Kingdom Come, when he gives Abdullah Smith advice on how to go about infiltrating The Other Light, and later when both he and his father are present at Mac McCullum's thousandth birthday party.

References